Kittima Sutanan (born 20 May 1992) is a Thai weightlifter.

Weightlifting career
She competed at the 2013 World Championships in the Women's 53 kg, winning the Bronze medal in clean & jerk. She also competed at the 2015 Asian Weightlifting Championships in the Women's 53 kg, winning the Bronze medal in snatch.

References

Kittima Sutanan
1992 births
World Weightlifting Championships medalists
Living people
Weightlifters at the 2014 Asian Games
Universiade medalists in weightlifting
Universiade silver medalists for Thailand
Kittima Sutanan
Medalists at the 2013 Summer Universiade
Kittima Sutanan